Mervyn S. Gotsman is Professor Emeritus of Cardiology at the Hebrew University of Jerusalem and Hadassah Medical Center in Jerusalem, Israel.

Biography 
Mervyn Samuel Gotsman was born in 1935 in the town of Hermanus in South Africa to Benjamin, a physicist, and Ada, a housewife. The family originally came to South Africa from Lithuania, with an intermediate station in England.

He studied medicine at the University of Cape Town, graduating summa cum laude. In 1958, following a relatively early death of his father, he worked as a general practitioner in a small mining town in Rhodesia.

In the early sixties, he specialized in tropical medicine, and later completed his internship in internal medicine and cardiology in London and Birmingham, England. In 1964 he returned to South Africa and joined the cardiac clinic at the Groote Schuur Hospital in Cape Town.
In 1967 he referred Louis Washkansky for the first successful heart transplant performed by Professor Christiaan Barnard.

In 1968 he was appointed the director of the Department of Cardiology in Durban, South Africa, and was appointed professor of medicine at the University of Natal.
He served as the chief cardiologist of the former Natal Province.

In 1973, he immigrated to Israel with his family and served as the director of the Department of Cardiology at the Hadassah Medical Center in Ein Karem, Jerusalem, a position he held until his retirement in 2000.
 He served as the personal physician to Prime Minister Menachem Begin, and accompanied him on his trips overseas.

He has published numerous scientific papers regarding all aspects of clinical cardiology.

He received the Worthy Citizen of Jerusalem award in 2007 for his contribution to cardiology in Israel.

References

External links 
 Prof. Mervyn Gotsman - Hadassah Medical Center Website
 
 Prof. Mervyn Gotsman - Memoirs

1935 births
Living people
South African emigrants to Israel
South African Jews
South African people of Lithuanian-Jewish descent
Israeli people of South African-Jewish descent
Israeli people of Lithuanian-Jewish descent
Israeli Jews
South African cardiologists
Israeli cardiologists
Academic staff of the University of Natal